Pasasana (Sanskrit: पाशासन; IAST: pāśāsana) or Noose Pose is an asana, a sitting meditation pose.

Etymology and origins 
The name comes from the Sanskrit word पाश, pāśa meaning "noose" or "snare",  and आसन, asana meaning "posture" or "seat".

The pose is described and illustrated in the 19th century Sritattvanidhi; a slightly different pose is described in the 1966 Light on Yoga.

Description 

In this yoga asana, the human body creates a 'noose' when the practitioner wraps their arms around their squatting legs (from Upaveshasana) with their hands clasped behind their back, while twisting to one side.

See also 

 List of asanas
 Pasini Mudra, the noose seal

References

Further reading

External links 

 Instruction for noose pose from Yoga Journal

Sitting asanas
Twisting asanas
Hip-opening asanas
Asymmetric asanas